This is the Recorded Music NZ list of number-one singles in New Zealand during the 2010s decade, starting from Monday 4 January 2010. From 7 November 2014, the chart also included data from audio on demand streaming services.

Chart
Key
 – Number-one single of the year
 – Song of New Zealand origin
 – Number-one single of the year, of New Zealand origin

By artist

Key
 – Song of New Zealand origin

By song
Key
 – Song of New Zealand origin

Notes

References

Number-one singles
New Zealand Singles
2010